The Gurghiu Mountains (Romanian: Munții Gurghiu, Hungarian: Görgény) are a range in the Căliman-Harghita Mountains of the Eastern Carpathians, Romania, in the Transylvania region.

The mountains are relatively low, but well-wooded and naturally beautiful. They are known for an abundance of wildlife, including deer, wild boar, wolves and bears.

The Gurghiu Mountains are part of the volcanic mountain chain in the western side of the Eastern Carpathians. In the north the Mureș River separates them from the Călimani Mountains. To the south are the Harghita Mountains and the Târnava River Valley.

The mountains were formed during a period of volcanic activity between 9.4 and 5.4 million years ago, starting in the north and moving southwards.

External links

References

Mountain ranges of Romania
Mountain ranges of the Eastern Carpathians